The North Florida Ospreys men's soccer program represents the University of North Florida in all NCAA Division I men's college soccer competitions. Founded in 1991, the Ospreys compete in the ASUN Conference. The Ospreys are coached by Derek Marinatos, who has coached the program since 2011. The Ospreys plays their home matches at Hodges Stadium, on the UNF campus.

Coaching history

Seasons 

Source:

Individual honors 
The following players have earned a postseason award.

National awards 
No players have won a national award.

Regional awards 
 NAIA All District
 1991: Gary McCall (2nd team)
 1992: Gary McCall (1st team)
 1992: Matt Sessions (2nd team)
 NSCAA All-South Region
 1993: Gary McCall (3rd team)
 1994: Nate Silva (2nd team)
 1994: Chris Dunn (3rd team)
 1996: A. J. Romano (2nd team)
 1996: Peter Sesay (2nd team)
 2009: Matthew Hollyoak (2nd team)

Conference awards 
 Atlantic Sun Men's Soccer Tournament MVP
 2015: Helge Pietschmann
 Peach Belt Conference Player of the Year
 2000: Danny Spake
 Peach Belt Conference Freshman of the Year
 1998: Robert West
 2004: Martin Pettersson

Team honors 
 Atlantic Sun Men's Soccer Tournament
 Winners (1): 2015
 Runners-up (2): 2013, 2014

References

External links 
 

 
1991 establishments in Florida
Soccer clubs in Florida
Association football clubs established in 1991